Green Lantern is an ongoing American comic-book series featuring the DC Comics heroes of the same name. The character's first incarnation, Alan Scott, appeared in All-American Comics #16 (July 1940), and was later spun off into the first volume of Green Lantern in 1941. After 38 issues, that series was cancelled in 1949. When the Silver Age Green Lantern, Hal Jordan, was introduced, the character starred in a new volume of Green Lantern starting in 1960.

Although Green Lantern is considered a mainstay in the DC Comics stable, the series has been cancelled and rebooted several times. The first series featuring Hal Jordan was cancelled at issue #224, but was restarted with a third volume and a new #1 issue in June 1990. When sales began slipping in the early 1990s, DC Comics instituted a controversial editorial mandate that turned Jordan into the supervillain Parallax and created a new protagonist named Kyle Rayner. This third volume ended publication in 2004, when the miniseries Green Lantern: Rebirth brought Hal Jordan back as a heroic character and made him the protagonist once again. After Rebirth'''s conclusion, writer Geoff Johns began a fourth volume of Green Lantern from 2005 to 2011, and a fifth volume which started immediately after, this time initially showcasing both Hal Jordan and Sinestro as Green Lanterns.

Publication history

Volume 1 (1941–1949)
Volume 1 was published from 1941 until 1949, spanning a total of 38 issues. The series featured Alan Scott, the first Green Lantern character, created by writer/artist Martin Nodell and writer Bill Finger. Alan's first appearance was in the anthology series, All-American Comics #16 (July 1940). The Green Lantern character received his own self-titled series in fall 1941. The first use of the Green Lantern oath was in issue #9 (late fall 1943). Artist Alex Toth did some of his earliest comics work on the title beginning with issue #28 (October–November 1947). A canine sidekick named Streak was introduced in #30 (February–March 1948) and the dog proved so popular that he became the featured character on several covers of the series starting with #34. The series was cancelled with #38 (May–June 1949). Although several subsequent Green Lantern revival projects have started over the years, this remains the only series to date to spotlight the Alan Scott character.

Volume 2 (1960–1972 and 1976–1988)

The Silver Age Green Lantern was created by John Broome and Gil Kane in Showcase #22 (October 1959) at the behest of editor Julius Schwartz. Volume 2 of Green Lantern began publication in August 1960. The series spotlighted the Silver Age Green Lantern, Hal Jordan and introduced the expansive mythology surrounding Hal's forebearers in the Green Lantern Corps. The supervillain Sinestro was introduced in #7 (July–August 1961). In 2009, Sinestro was ranked IGN's 15th Greatest Comic Book Villain of All Time. Hal Jordan's love interest, Carol Ferris, became the Star Sapphire in issue #16. Black Hand, a character featured prominently in the "Blackest Night" storyline in 2009–2010, debuted in issue #29 (June 1964). A substitute Green Lantern, Guy Gardner first appeared in the story "Earth's Other Green Lantern!" in issue #59 (March 1968).

Green Arrow joined Hal Jordan in the main feature of the title in an acclaimed series of stories by writer Dennis O'Neil and artist Neal Adams beginning with issue #76 (April 1970) and ending with issue #122 (November 1979) that dealt with various social and political issues in which Green Arrow spoke for radical change while Green Lantern was an establishment conservative figure, wanting to work within existing institutions of government and law. Where Oliver Queen advocated direct action, Hal Jordan wanted to work within the system; where Oliver advocated social change, Jordan was more concerned about dealing with criminals. Each would find their beliefs challenged by the other. Oliver convinced Jordan to see beyond his strict obedience to the Green Lantern Corps, to help those who were neglected or discriminated against. As O'Neil explained: "He would be a hot-tempered anarchist to contrast with the cerebral, sedate model citizen who was the Green Lantern." The duo embarked on a quest to find America, witnessing the problems of corruption, racism, pollution, and overpopulation confronting the nation. O'Neil took on then-current events, such as the Manson Family cult murders, in issue #78 where Black Canary falls briefly under the spell of a false prophet who advocates violence.

During this period, the most famous Green Arrow story appeared, in Green Lantern vol. 2, #85–86, when Green Arrow's ward Speedy was revealed to be addicted to heroin.McAvennie "1970s" in Dolan, p. 146 "It was taboo to depict drugs in comics, even in ways that openly condemned their use.  However, writer Denny O'Neil and artist Neal Adams collaborated on an unforgettable two-part arc that brought the issue directly into Green Arrow's home, and demonstrated the power comics had to affect change and perception." In his zeal to save America, Oliver Queen had failed in his personal responsibility to Speedy — who would overcome his addiction with the help of Black Canary, Green Arrow's then-love interest. This story prompted a congratulatory letter from the mayor of New York City, John Lindsay. Another backup Green Lantern, John Stewart, was introduced in #87. Unfortunately, the series did not match commercial expectations and Neal Adams had trouble with deadlines, causing issue #88 to be an unscheduled reprint issue; the series was cancelled with issue #89 (April–May 1972). Four months later, Green Lantern began a backup feature in The Flash #217 (Aug.-Sept. 1972) and appeared in most issues through The Flash #246 (Jan. 1977) until his own solo series was revived.

The Green Lantern title returned with issue #90 (Aug.-Sept. 1976)McAvennie "1970s" in Dolan, p. 171 "After a four-year hiatus, Green Lantern's ongoing series made a triumphant return to DC's publishing schedule...Returning writer Denny O'Neil partnered himself with artist Mike Grell, choosing to focus the title on sci-fi and super-heroics." and continued the Green Lantern/Green Arrow team format. Julius Schwartz, who had edited the title for most of its run since 1960, left the series as of issue #103 (April 1978). In issue #123 (December 1979), Hal Jordan resumed the title spotlight and Green Arrow left the series. On the advice of artist Joe Staton, editor Jack C. Harris gave British artist Brian Bolland his first assignment for a U.S. comics publisher, the cover for Green Lantern #127 (April 1980). Writer Marv Wolfman and Staton created the Omega Men in Green Lantern #141 (June 1981).

In issue #182, writer Len Wein and artist Dave Gibbons made architect John Stewart, who had been introduced previously in issue #87, the title's primary character. Following the double-sized 200th issue by writer Steve Englehart and Joe Staton, the format changed again, this time altering the title's name to Green Lantern Corps and focusing upon the seven members of an Earth-based contingent of the corps (including Jordan and Stewart). The series remained as such until its cancellation in 1988 with issue #224. Between volumes 2 and 3, Green Lantern stories, mostly featuring Hal Jordan, appeared in Action Comics Weekly.

Volume 3 (1990–2004)

Volume 3 began in 1990 and featured Hal Jordan and the Green Lantern Corps in stories by Gerard Jones and Pat Broderick. By the mid-1990s, sales on the book began to fall and an editorial mandate was handed down by DC Comics to drastically change the status quo to revitalize the title and characters. This was given in the form of the controversial storyline "Emerald Twilight".

"Emerald Twilight" detailed that in the aftermath of the destruction of Hal Jordan's hometown Coast City (which occurred as part of "The Death of Superman" storyline), Jordan was shown going mad with grief by trying to use his power to resurrect the city and its inhabitants. The Guardians of the Universe found fault with Jordan and stated their intent to strip him of his ring. Jordan responded angrily, and sought not only the destruction of the Guardians, but also the Green Lantern Corps itself. He killed countless Green Lanterns in his rampage through the universe to Oa, seemingly killed his arch enemy Sinestro, killed the Guardians and took the power of Oa's Central Power Battery for himself. Gaining unimaginable power over space and time, Jordan became the supervillain Parallax and, with that, became the leading antagonist going into DC's 1994 event Zero Hour: Crisis in Time.

After this, Kyle Rayner, a young art student, was introduced as the new protagonist and the "last" Green Lantern, since the Corps no longer existed. Writers Ron Marz and Judd Winick both had long runs with the character, building Rayner's popularity so much that he was included in the lineup of Grant Morrison's Justice League relaunch JLA, and slowly reintroduced more familiar Green Lantern aspects over the 10 years Rayner had in the title. Volume 3 culminated in a revival of the Guardians of the Universe, the introduction of Ion, and Kyle taking a journey into space that led directly into the miniseries Green Lantern: Rebirth.

Volume 4 (2005–2011)

After the events of Rebirth, in which writer Geoff Johns revealed Parallax to be a parasitic embodiment of fear rather than as an identity of Hal Jordan, a fourth volume of Green Lantern began publication returning Hal Jordan to the prominent Green Lantern in the DC Universe. Johns and artist Carlos Pacheco launched the new series in July 2005. Trying to rebuild his life, Hal Jordan has moved to the nearly deserted Coast City, which is slowly being reconstructed. He has been reinstated as a Captain in the United States Air Force, and works in the Test Pilot Program at Edwards Air Force Base. The series introduces new supporting characters for Hal, most notably a man from Hal's past, Air Force's General Jonathan "Herc" Stone, who learned Hal's secret as Green Lantern during a battle with the Manhunters and acts as his ally. He also begins to develop a romantic attraction with his fellow pilot, the beautiful Captain Jillian "Cowgirl" Pearlman. The returning characters also include Carol Ferris, Tom Kalmaku, and Hal's younger brother James Jordan with his sister-in-law Susan and their children, Howard and Jane.

In his new title, he faces revamped versions of his Silver Age foes such as Hector Hammond, the Shark, and Black Hand. As part of DC's revision of the entire universe, as of Green Lantern vol. 4, #10, the series has skipped ahead one year, bringing drastic changes to Hal Jordan's life, as with every other hero in the DC Universe. It is revealed that Jordan spent time as a P.O.W. in an unnamed conflict and has feelings of guilt from his inability to free himself and his fellow captives.

A new account of Green Lantern's origins was released in the 2008 Green Lantern series "Secret Origin". In this new origin, Hal Jordan, is working as an assistant mechanic under Tom Kalmaku himself, barred from flying due to his insubordination while in the USAF and his employers lingering guilt about his father's death in the line of duty, when Abin Sur, fighting Atrocitus of the Five Inversion, crashes near Coast City. Hal and the rest of the Green Lantern Corps find themselves at war with Sinestro and his army, the Sinestro Corps during the events of the Sinestro Corps War

Leading into the "Blackest Night" storyline, the "Rage of the Red Lanterns" arc features Jordan making use of both Red and Blue power rings. In the Agent Orange story arc, Hal Jordan is briefly in command of Larfleeze's power battery after he steals it from him in a battle. The orange light of avarice converses with Jordan, his costume changes, and he becomes an Orange Lantern. Larfleeze quickly takes his power battery back from Jordan. The Green Lantern mythology is center stage with the DC crossover event Blackest Night, which sees dead heroes and villains across the DC Universe becoming active as members of the Black Lantern Corps. Combating Black Lanterns with fellow DC characters the Flash, the Atom, and Mera, Jordan fights alongside the high-profile members of every corps in the emotional spectrum, and oversees new DC characters inductions into all the other corps. Jordan and his "New Guardians" move with the other new corps members to combat the Black Lantern Corps and its leader Nekron directly.

After the conclusion to Blackest Night, the Green Lantern title tied into the aftermath event Brightest Day, with several members of Corps from across the emotional spectrum seeking to gain control of the White Entity that settled on Earth in the final issue of Blackest Night. After the conclusion of Brightest Day, the mad ex-Guardian of the Universe Krona returns, taking control of the Green Lantern Corps and causing Hal, John Stewart, Guy Gardner, and Kyle Rayner to fight their brothers-in-arms across the War of the Green Lanterns event. The War story ends with Hal Jordan killing Krona, an act which alarms the Guardians enough that they strip Hal of his ring and return him to Earth, no longer serving as Green Lantern of Sector 2814. In his place, inexplicably, is Sinestro, former renegade and enemy of the Corps, serving in Hal's place to the shock and chagrin of everyone involved.

On May 31, 2011, it was announced that all published comics taking place within the shared DC Universe would be either canceled or relaunched with new #1 issues, after a new continuity was created in the wake of the Flashpoint limited series. The first issue of the new volume of Green Lantern was released on September 14, 2011.

Volume 5 (2011–2016)

In September 2011, The New 52 rebooted DC's continuity. In this new timeline, DC Comics relaunched Green Lantern with a new issue #1, written again by Geoff Johns and penciled by Doug Mahnke. As with all of the books associated with the DC relaunch, Hal Jordan appears to be about five years younger than the previous incarnation of the character. Superheroes at large have appeared only in the past five years, and are viewed with at best, suspicion, and at worst, outright hostility.

DC Comics editorial confirmed that the entire history of Johns' previous run on the Green Lantern title is still a part of the continuity of The New 52, with major storylines "Rebirth", "Sinestro Corps War", "Blackest Night", and "Brightest Day" all still forming the backbone of the recent history of the characters. As a result, the new volume of Green Lantern continues directly from the events of War of the Green Lanterns, with Sinestro serving as a Green Lantern and Hal Jordan beginning the series powerless on Earth.

The title's first story arc, simply titled "Sinestro", deals with the former renegade's return to the Green Lantern Corps and Hal Jordan's mundane earthbound life. While on patrol, Sinestro visits his home planet of Korugar, and to his horror discovers that the remaining members of the Sinestro Corps have enslaved the planet's populace. In order to assist him in retaking the planet, Sinestro travels to Earth and creates a ring for Hal Jordan, his greatest enemy.

Following Hal Jordan and Sinestro's apparent deaths at the hands of the Guardians of the Universe while facing Black Hand, Simon Baz, an Arab-Muslim, becomes the newest Green Lantern from Earth in Green Lantern #0. Later following Jordan's revival in Issue 20, the series shifted to focusing on him exclusively once again where he is now the leader of the Green Lantern Corps. The series later shifted where following the major incidents over the next few story arcs, Hal Jordan voluntarily became a scapegoat to preserve the Green Lanterns' reputation and officially became a renegade starting from the series 40th issue, using the same gauntlet Krona once had in place of a Power Ring which lasted until the series' conclusion.

Green Lanterns and Hal Jordan and the Green Lantern Corps (2016–2018)
As part of the DC Rebirth relaunch of DC's titles in 2016, Green Lantern was cancelled and replaced with two new series: Green Lanterns starring Simon Baz and Jessica Cruz and Hal Jordan and the Green Lantern Corps staring Hal Jordan.

The Green Lantern and Blackstars (2018–2021) 

Volume 6 (2021–2022)

 Volume 7 (2023-) 
In January 2023, it was announced that a new Green Lantern ongoing would begin publication on May 9, 2023. The series will be written by Jeremy Adams  and feature art by Xermánico. It will also back up that will set up a John Stewart miniseries, with both being written by Phillip Kennedy Johnson and drawn by Osvaldo Montos. From an official description from DC, "Spinning out of the events of Dark Crisis on Infinite Earths, the Guardians of Oa at the heart of the Green Lantern Corps have quarantined Sector 2814, home of the planet Earth—and its champion along with it! A heartbreaking defeat has sent Hal reeling, returning home to rediscover his roots…and find the man responsible for ruining his life: Sinestro. At least if you’re willing to hot-wire a power ring to do it." 

Collected editions
Several of the comic books have been collected into individual volumes:

 Green Lantern vol. 1 (1941–1949) 

 Green Lantern vol. 2 (1959–1988) 

 Green Lantern vol. 3 (1990–2004) Superman: The Return of Superman includes Green Lantern vol. 3 #46, 480 pages, December 1993, 

 Green Lantern vol. 4 (2005–2011) 

 Green Lantern vol. 5 (2011–2016) 

 Hal Jordan and the Green Lantern Corps (2016–2018) 

 Green Lanterns (2016–2018) 

 Collections with multi-series spans Green Lantern Corps: Through The Ages collects Green Lantern vol. 2 #30, Green Lantern vol. 4 #3, Showcase #22, Green Lantern Gallery, Green Lantern: Emerald Dawn #4 and Green Lantern Secret Files and Origins 2005Green Lantern: In Brightest Day collects Green Lantern vol. 2 #7, 40, 59, 162, 173, 177, 182, 183 and 188, Green Lantern vol. 3 #51, Green Lantern Corps Quarterly #6 and Green Lantern Corps Annual #2, Green Lantern: The Greatest Stories Ever Told collects Green Lantern vol. 2 #1, 31, 74, 87, 172, Green Lantern vol. 3 #3, Flash/Green Lantern: Brave/Bold #2, Showcase #22 and Green Lantern Secret Files and Origins 2005, 

MiniseriesGreen Lantern: Circle of Fire Collects Green Lantern and Adam Strange #1, Green Lantern and Firestorm the Nuclear Man #1, Green Lantern and Green Lantern #1, Green Lantern and Power Girl #1, Green Lantern and the Atom #1, & Green Lantern: Circle Of Fire'' #1–2.

References

External links

1941 comics debuts
1949 comics endings
1960 comics debuts
1972 comics endings
1976 comics debuts
1988 comics endings
1990 comics debuts
2004 comics endings
2005 comics debuts
2011 comics endings
2011 comics debuts
2019 comics debuts
2019 comics endings
2020 comics debuts

Comics by Dave Gibbons
Comics by Dennis O'Neil
Comics by Gardner Fox
Comics by Geoff Johns
Comics by Len Wein
Comics by Marv Wolfman
Comics by Neal Adams
Comics by Paul Kupperberg
Comics by Steve Englehart
Comics set on fictional planets
GLAAD Media Award for Outstanding Comic Book winners